Repyevka is a rural locality (a selo) and the administrative center of Repyevsky Rural Settlement, Volokonovsky District, Belgorod Oblast, Russia. The population was 211 as of 2010. There are 3 streets.

Geography 
Repyevka is located 19 km northeast of Volokonovka (the district's administrative centre) by road. Lutovinovo is the nearest rural locality.

References 

Rural localities in Volokonovsky District